The Road to the Wall is a 1962 American short documentary film produced by Robert Saudek about the construction of the Berlin Wall. It was nominated for an Academy Award for Best Documentary Short.

See also
 List of American films of 1962

References

External links

The Road to the Wall at the National Archives and Records Administration

1962 films
1962 short films
1962 documentary films
1960s in Berlin
American short documentary films
Films about the Berlin Wall
Documentary films about historical events
Documentary films about Berlin
1960s short documentary films
1960s English-language films
1960s American films